The Barton River is a tributary of Lake Memphremagog, over  long, in northern Vermont in the United States.

It runs north from Glover through Barton, Brownington, Coventry and drains through Newport into Lake Memphremagog's South Bay.

Course
The Barton River arises from the fountains of the former Runaway Pond in Glover.

Roaring Brook runs from Parker Pond in West Glover to the river in southern Barton near Route 16.

One of the head branches is the drain from Crystal Lake in the village of Barton.

After leaving Barton village, U.S. Route 5, Interstate 91 and the railroad all follow the course of the Barton River valley north to Newport.

The Willoughby River flows from Lake Willoughby into the Barton River in Orleans and provides considerable volume. Orleans was once called "Barton Landing" and was the place where, historically, craft could be safely loaded for transport north.

After leaving Orleans, it flows through eastern Irasburg, through Coventry and then into Lake Memphremagog.

Parts of the following Vermont towns are in the Barton River watershed: Derby, Coventry, Brownington, Irasburg], Barton, Westmore,  Sheffield, Glover, and Albany. Water bodies in the watershed include Lake Willoughby, Crystal Lake, Shadow Lake, Lake Parker, and Brownington Pond.

See also
List of rivers of Vermont
List of rivers of the United States

References

External links

Vermont Agency of Natural Resources retrieved July 17, 2008

Rivers of Vermont
Lake Memphremagog
Derby, Vermont
Glover, Vermont
Barton, Vermont
Barton (village), Vermont
Brownington, Vermont
Orleans, Vermont
Irasburg, Vermont
Coventry, Vermont
Westmore, Vermont
Northeast Kingdom, Vermont
Rivers of Orleans County, Vermont
Tributaries of the Saint Lawrence River